William Barker  was an Anglican priest in Ireland.

Barker was educated at Trinity College, Dublin.  He was Dean of Raphoe from 1757 until his death in 1776. His grandson was the second Anglican bishop of Sydney.

Notes

18th-century Irish Anglican priests
1776 deaths
Alumni of Trinity College, Cambridge
Deans of Raphoe
Year of birth missing